This order of battle lists the German, Hungarian, Romanian, and Soviet forces involved in the Battle of Debrecen in October 1944.

Order of Battle for 6th Army, October 1944

Order of Battle for Second Ukrainian Front, October 1944
2nd Ukrainian Front (Marshal Rodion Malinovsky)

7th Guards Army (Lieutenant General Mikhail Shumilov)
24th Guards Rifle Corps
72nd Guards Rifle Division
81st Guards Rifle Division
6th Rifle Division
25th Guards Rifle Corps
6th Guards Airborne Division
36th Guards Rifle Division
53rd Rifle Division
Army Reserves
227th Rifle Division
27th Army (Lieutenant General Sergei Trofimenko)
35th Guards Rifle Corps
3rd Guards Airborne Division
93rd Rifle Division
180th Rifle Division
202nd Rifle Division
33rd Rifle Corps
78th Rifle Division
337th Rifle Division
104th Rifle Corps
4th Guards Airborne Division
163rd Rifle Division
206th Rifle Division
Army Reserve
11th Artillery Division
27th Guards Tank Brigade
Romanian 2nd Mountain Division
Romanian 3rd Mountain Division
Romanian 18th Infantry Division
 Romanian Tudor Vladimirescu Infantry Division
40th Army (Lieutenant General Filipp Zhmachenko)
50th Rifle Corps
240th Rifle Division
51st Rifle Corps
38th Rifle Division
133rd Rifle Division
232nd Rifle Division
Army Reserve
42nd Guards Rifle Division

46th Army (Lieutenant General Ivan Shlemin)
10th Guards Rifle Corps
49th Guards Rifle Division
59th Guards Rifle Division
86th Guards Rifle Division
109th Guards Rifle Division
31st Guards Rifle Corps
4th Guards Rifle Division
34th Guards Rifle Division
40th Guards Rifle Division
37th Rifle Corps
108th Guards Rifle Division
320th Rifle Division
Army Reserve
7th Breakthrough Artillery Division
53rd Army (Lieutenant General Ivan Managarov)
27th Guards Rifle Corps
297th Rifle Division
409th Rifle Division
49th Rifle Corps
1st Guards Airborne Division
110th Guards Rifle Division
375th Rifle Division
57th Rifle Corps
203rd Rifle Division
228th Rifle Division
243rd Rifle Division
Army Reserve
18th Tank Corps
5th Guards Breakthrough Artillery Division

6th Guards Tank Army (Major General Andrei Grigoryevich Kravchenko)
9th Guards Mechanized Corps
5th Guards Tank Corps
6th Self-Propelled Artillery Brigade
Romanian Cavalry Corps
1st Cavalry Training Division
1st Infantry Training Division
Cavalry – Mechanized Group Pliyev (Major General Issa Pliyev)
4th Guards Cavalry Corps
9th Guards Cavalry Division
10th Guards Cavalry Division
30th Cavalry Division
6th Guards Cavalry Corps
8th Guards Cavalry Division
13th Guards Cavalry Division
8th Cavalry Division
7th Mechanized Corps
Cavalry – Mechanized Group Gorshkov (Major General Sergey Gorshkov)
5th Guards Cavalry Corps
11th Guards Cavalry Division
12th Guards Cavalry Division
63rd Cavalry Division
23rd Tank Corps

Romanian First Army (General Nicolae Macici)
IV Corps
2nd Infantry Division
4th Infantry Division
VII Corps
9th Cavalry Division
19th Infantry Division
Romanian Fourth Army (General Gheorghe Avramescu)
Mountain Corps
 1st Mountain Division
3rd Infantry Division
6th Infantry Division
II Corps
8th Cavalry Division
20th Infantry Division
VI Corps
7th Infantry Division
9th Infantry Division
21st Infantry Division
Army Reserve
1st Cavalry Division
11th Infantry Division
Armored Group (Remnants of 1st Armored Division)
Front Reserve
2nd Guards Mechanized Corps
25th Guards Rifle Division
303rd Rifle Division

Notes

References
 Axworthy, Mark - Third Axis Fourth Ally, 368 pages, 
 БОЕВОЙ СОСТАВ СОВЕТСКОЙ АРМИИ (Soviet Army Order of Battle) 1941-1945
 Buchner, Alex - Ostfront 1944, 336 pages, 
 Erickson, John - The Road to Berlin, 877 pages, 
 
 Friessner, Hans - Verratene Schlachten (Betrayed Battles), 264 pages, Holsten-Verlag, Hamburg, 1956
 Glantz, David M. - Slaughterhouse: The Handbook of the Eastern Front 520 pages,  
 Glantz, David M. - When Titans Clashed, 414 pages, 
 Haupt, Werner - Die 8.Panzer-Division im Zweiten Weltkrieg
 Hinze, Dr. Rolf - Mit dem Mut der Verzweifelung, 562 pages 
 Hinze, Dr. Rolf - To The Bitter End : The Final Battles of Army Groups A, North Ukraine, Centre-Eastern Front, 1944-45
 Mitcham, Samuel W. Jr - Crumbling Empire. The German Defeat in the East, 1944 336 pages, 
 Niehorster, Leo W. G. - The Royal Hungarian Army 1920 - 1945, 313 pages, 
 Pierik, Perry - Hungary 1944-1945. The Forgotten Tragedy
 Ustinov, D. F. - Geschichte des Zweiten Welt Krieges (German translation of the Soviet official history, volume 9), 684 pages
 Zaloga, Steven J., and Ness, Leland S. - Red Army Handbook 1939-1945,  230 pages, 
 Ziemke, Earl F. - Stalingrad to Berlin, 549 pages, U.S. Government Printing Office, 1968
 Biographies website for World War II generals

World War II orders of battle